Eritrean Islamic Jihad is referred to as the Eritrean Islamic Salvation Movement, EIJM, EIJ, ERIJ, EISM, Eritrean Islamic Jihad Movement, and/or Harakat al Jihad al Islami al Eritrea. The Eritrean Islamic Jihad Movement (ERIJ), is one of several opposition groups that operates in Eritrea and from surrounding countries.

Goals and objectives
The primary goal of the ERIJ is to spread the Islamic ideology and the rule by Islamic law -Sharia and overthrow of the Eritrean government of President Isaias Afewerki, and his ruling People's Front for Democracy and Justice (PFDJ), formerly referred to as the Eritrean People's Liberation Front (EPLF). The PFDJ is the only legally permitted political party in Eritrea. ERIJ also seeks the establishment of an Islamic Government in Eritrea with an eye toward establishing a caliphate in the Horn of Africa. In September 1998, an opposition congress was held in Khartoum, Sudan. At that time, the Eritrean opposition group Harakat al Jihad al Islami (Eritrean Islamic Jihad Movement-ERIJ) reportedly changed its name to Harakat al Khalas al Islami al Eritrea (Eritrean Islamic Salvation Movement).

Leadership
Shaikh Khalil Mohammed Amer is the putative leader of ERIJ. ERIJ's Deputy Emir is Abul Bara' Hassan Salman.

Foreign support
Sudanese authorities have signaled their official support of the movement when they allowed the ERIJ's Secretary-General Sheikh Khalil Mohammed Amer to hold a news conference in Khartoum.

History of attacks
 April 12, 2003: Timothy Nutt, a 49-year-old British geologist was murdered in western Eritrea allegedly by ERIJ. ERIJ denied responsibility for the attack. Nutt's throat was cut and his vehicle had been burned. His body was found in a dry stream-bed near the village of Bisha. Nutt reportedly worked for the Canadian firm Nevsun Resources, a mineral exploration company specialising in gold and diamond mining.
 August 10, 2003: Two aid workers were killed and another injured when their vehicle was attacked by gunmen in Northern Eritrea. The victims worked for Mercy Corps, a US charity, which has long had a presence in the region. Although no group claimed the attack, Eritrean authorities suspect Eritrean Islamic Jihad Movement (ERIJ) which is supported by Sudan.

References

External links
Federation of American Scientists Intelligence Research Program
HORN OF AFRICA: Armed factions and the Ethiopia-Eritrea conflict UN Office for the Coordination of Humanitarian Affairs 14 May 1999
The Deputy Amir of the Eritrean Islamic Jihad Movement - Abul Bara' Hassan Salman: The Governing Regime is a Terrorist Regime Which Acts With Enmity Against the Eritrean People Nida'ul Islam Magazine (Call of Islam) February - March 1998
The Terrorism Knowledge Base

UK geologist 'killed by Eritrea rebels'

Islamism in Eritrea
Jihadist groups
Political parties in Eritrea
Rebel groups in Eritrea
Terrorism in Afghanistan
Islamic terrorism
Terrorism in Africa